Catherine of Bosnia (1294–1355) was daughter of Stephen I, Ban of Bosnia and sister of Stephen II, Ban of Bosnia.

She was daughter of Stephen I, Ban of Bosnia and his wife Elizabeth of Syrmia. She was born in 1294, in Srebrenik. She had six siblings, five brothers, Stephen II, Vladislav, Ninoslav, Miroslav and unknown brother, and a sister named Mary. In autumn 1314 she was in exile with family in Dubrovnik. Catherine will marry prince Nikola of Hum sometime before 1338. Nikola was knyaz from Hum 1322, which Stephen II, brother of Catherine, at the time Ban of Bosnia, annexed to his realm. After the annexation, Ban granted Nikola positions in župas in Bosansko Primorje, at the southern edge of the realm, region between the Neretva Delta and Ragusa, bestowing him with the right to rule most of the Popovo. He is ruled this župa as long as he lived. Catherine and Nikola had two sons:
 Vladislav Nikolić
 Bogiša Nikolić
Catherine died in 1355 in Bribir.

References

Kotromanić dynasty
House of Nikolić
1294 births
1355 deaths

People from Srebrenik